American Dreamer is a 1984 American romantic comedy-thriller film directed by Rick Rosenthal from a script by Ann Biderman, David Greenwalt and Jim Kouf. It stars JoBeth Williams and Tom Conti.

It follows an American housewife (Williams) who wins a trip to Paris in a mystery-writing contest. She loses her memory when she is hit by a car, and begins acting as if she were the female detective in her story.

Plot 
A voice over says, "No, that's not right."  The scenario is repeated with adjustments until the voice is eventually satisfied. The screen fades to Cathy Palmer sitting at a typewriter, finishing up the story. She seals it in an envelope and sends it off. When Kevin, her conventional, self-centered husband, comes home, she tells him about entering a contest to write a short story following the "Rebecca Ryan" series of novels. He is patronizing, telling her, "The important thing, kid, is that you're doing something you like to do."

Cathy is notified by mail that she has won the contest, the prize is an all-expense-paid trip to Paris for two, an award ceremony and a meeting with the author of the "Rebecca Ryan" novels. Kevin tries to persuade her to decline, but she goes on the trip alone. While sightseeing in Paris, her purse is snatched. Chasing the thief, she runs into a street where she is hit by a car.

The accident leaves Cathy with amnesia; she thinks she is the detective, Rebecca Ryan. Escaping from the hospital she assumes Rebecca's dashing persona, lavish wardrobe, and residence at the Hôtel de Crillon. The hotel staff are so in awe of the novels that they go along with her demands. When she enters "Rebecca's" apartment, she is greeted by Alan McMann, who thinks she is the clerical assistant he has requested from an agency. He is the actual author of the "Rebecca Ryan" novels. Cathy ignores all of the tasks he assigns her, instead believing that Alan is Rebecca's gay sidekick, Dimitri.

Cathy as Rebecca is convinced that she must save Victor Marchand (Giancarlo Giannini), the leader of the opposition party, from an assassination plot. Rebecca and Alan chase Victor around Paris in an attempt to protect him from the (fictitious) murder plot, with Victor instead getting injured several times from Rebecca's rescues. They are also running from a shadowy figure. Rebecca and Alan flee to Alan's mother's house.  While there, Alan and Rebecca consummate their relationship.

Kevin, who has been following them, enters the house and meets Rebecca and Alan coming down the stairs. He punches Alan, but Rebecca doesn't see him. She and Alan run off to save Victor, who is on a train, but he jumps from it.

Rebecca and Alan come face to face with Kevin and Cathy's memory is back. She wakes in the hospital. Alan and his literary agent announce that Cathy's writing is so good that she could get a lucrative book deal.

While recovering at a hospital, Cathy apologizes to Alan for her delusions and bids him goodbye. At the airport, she realizes that she does not want to go home with Kevin. 
Leaving Kevin at the airport, she returns to the hotel to find Alan. They embrace, and are soon kidnapped.

Cathy and Alan learn their kidnapper is Victor, the man they'd been trying to "protect" all along. He has been seriously injured from Rebecca's repeated rescue attempts, and is clad in neck brace and arm sling, and walks with a cane. He reveals he is running a drug-smuggling operation, and he believes that Cathy and Alan know about his secret criminal dealings. Alan tries to tell Victor the truth about Cathy's accidental amnesia and series of lucky coincidences, but Victor doesn't believe them. Cathy and Alan manage to escape from their bonds and, in a leap of faith, jump into the moat surrounding Victor's chateau, eluding him and his henchmen.

The scene shifts to a living room. Cathy and Alan (now a couple and writing partners) are reading the manuscript of the most recent Rebecca Ryan novel to Cathy's two boys. They get to the end of the chapter, and pack the kids off to bed, in spite of their demands to know "what happens next". The film ends with some banter and cuddling where Alan and Cathy tease that the next part of the Rebecca Ryan story (i.e. their story) is too sexy to be written down.

Cast
 JoBeth Williams as Cathy Palmer / Rebecca Ryan
 Tom Conti as Alan McMann
 Giancarlo Giannini as Victor Marchand
 Coral Browne as Margaret McMann
 James Staley as Kevin Palmer
 Christopher Daniel Barnes as Kevin Palmer Jr.
 Huckleberry Fox as Karl Palmer
 Jean Rougerie as Don Carlos
 Pierre Santini as Inspector Klaus
 Léon Zitrone as Ivan Stranauvlitch
 André Valardy as Dimitri
 Pierre Olaf as Priest
 Ginette Garcin as Nurse

Production
Jobeth Williams was coming off a string of successful films at the time including Stir Crazy and Poltergeist. She had also shot (but not yet been seen in) The Big Chill and The Day After. Williams accepted the part over supporting Robert Redford in The Natural because she wanted to make a film like Charade. "I think audiences are ready for a film with a romantic background," she said.

"I loved the Katharine Hepburn comedies, the Ernest Lubitsch and Frank Capra films," said Williams. "There's nothing like a good screwball comedy, but I can't tell you how few scripts there are in that field. I wish I could do more."

Reception
American Dreamer was not a critical or box-office success.

Vincent Canby opened the review in The New York Times as follows:

References

External links
 
 

1984 films
1980s adventure films
American comedy thriller films
1984 romantic comedy films
Films set in Paris
Films about writers
Films about amnesia
Warner Bros. films
CBS Theatrical Films films
Films directed by Rick Rosenthal
1980s English-language films
1980s American films
Films about disability